Dobrá Voda is a municipality and village in Pelhřimov District in the Vysočina Region of the Czech Republic. It has about 200 inhabitants.

Administrative parts
Villages of Letny and Rohovka are administrative parts of Dobrá Voda.

History
The first written mention of Dobrá Voda is from 1414.

References

Villages in Pelhřimov District